Mont Boisjoli is a hill that rises to approximately  in Hatley, Quebec, Canada.

History
The hill has officially carried the name "Mont Boisjoli" since 1983. In the 1940s, a  skiing station called Ski Montjoye opened on the hill, and in the 1970s a chalet was constructed to accommodate visitors and events. Eventually, the ski station closed.

Hatley Group, its current owner, purchased the property from the City of Sherbrooke for CA $526,500 in 2009.

Recreation
The hill is open year-round, and hikers may use its trails for free. In the winter, visitors may slide down the mountain using inner tubes or mini-tubes for a fee. According to the Hatley Group website, there are plans to install infrastructure for tri-ski sleds, mini luge, river tubing, and to extend the hiking trails in the park.

References

External links
 Official website of the park

Mountains of Quebec under 1000 metres